The Women's individual pursuit competition at the 2019 UCI Track Cycling World Championships was held on 2 March 2019.

Results

Qualifying
The qualifying was started at 14:17. The first two racers raced for gold, the third and fourth fastest rider raced for the bronze medal.

Finals
The finals were started at 19:07.

References

Women's individual pursuit
2019